Ricardo Pereira may refer to:

 Ricardo Pereira (actor) (born 1979), Portuguese actor, model and television presenter
 Ricardo (footballer, born 1976) (Ricardo Alexandre Martins Soares Pereira), retired Portuguese footballer
 Ricardo Pereira (footballer, born 1993) (Ricardo Domingos Barbosa Pereira), Portuguese footballer also known as  Ricardo
 Joca (footballer, born 1981) (Ricardo Jorge da Silva Pinto Pereira), retired Portuguese footballer
 Ricardo Martins Pereira (born 1986), commonly known as Ricardinho, Brazilian footballer